The 2014–15 Croatian Premier Handball League is the 24th season of the Premier League, Croatia's premier Handball league.

Team information 

The following 16 clubs compete in the Premijer liga during the 2014–15 season:

Regular season

Standings

Pld - Played; W - Won; D - Drawn; L - Lost; GF - Goals for; GA - Goals against; Diff - Difference; Pts - Points.

Schedule and results
In the table below the home teams are listed on the left and the away teams along the top.

Championship round

Standings

Pld - Played; W - Won; D - Drawn; L - Lost; GF - Goals for; GA - Goals against; Diff - Difference; Pts - Points.

Schedule and results
In the table below the home teams are listed on the left and the away teams along the top.

Number of teams by counties

References

External links
 Croatian Handball Federaration 

2014–15 domestic handball leagues